Karina W. Davidson is senior vice president of research, dean of academic affairs, and head of the center focused on behavioral and cardiovascular health research at Northwell Health
She was previously vice-dean of organizational effectiveness and executive director of the Center for Behavioral Cardiovascular Health at Columbia University Medical Center. She was also Chief Academic Officer at NewYork-Presbyterian Hospital in New York City.

Education 
Davidson received her education in Canada, earning her B.A. degree with honors from Queen’s University in Kingston, Ontario, Canada and her M.A.Sc. in Industrial and Organizational Psychology and her Ph.D. in Clinical Psychology from the University of Waterloo in Waterloo, Ontario. She also served as a health and child clinical psychology intern at Kitchener-Waterloo Hospital and has been licensed in psychology by the Nova Scotia, Ontario, and Alabama Boards of Examiners and by the University of the State of New York Education Department.

Career 
Davidson received her first faculty appointment in 1991 from Dalhousie University in Halifax, Nova Scotia as Assistant Professor of Psychology. In 1996, she became Assistant Professor of Psychology at the University of Alabama, where she became tenured Associate Professor in 2000. She then moved to New York, where she was at Mount Sinai School of Medicine in the division of Cardiology for the next three years. In 2003, Davidson was appointed Co-Director of the Center of the Behavioral Cardiovascular Health at Columbia University Medical Center. She became Director of the Center in 2008, and in her position as tenured Professor of Medicine, Cardiology, and Psychiatry she oversaw a team of researchers who study how behavior, health disparities, and psychosocial factors affect the biology and incidence of hypertension and heart disease. In 2016, she became Vice-Dean of Organizational Effectiveness for Columbia University College of Physicians & Surgeons and Chief Academic Officer at NewYork-Presbyterian Hospital. Her portfolio for these two leadership positions focuses on clinical learning environment innovation for medical students and residents and executive leadership training programs for the next generation of medical school and hospital leaders.

Research Focus 
While working at Dalhousie University, Davidson became keenly interested in the relationship between psychosocial risk factors and their role in the course and outcome of cardiovascular disease. Since then, she has been the recipient of numerous National Institutes of Health (NIH) grants and has authored a number of high impact studies which have contributed to the evidence base of behavioral cardiology, a new frontier in the field of cardiology.

In a study of the association between anger expression and coronary heart disease (CHD), Davidson and colleagues found that men who constructively expressed anger had a lower incident rate of CHD, but that destructive anger justification increased the rate. Another paper from the same study showed that increased positive affect was associated with a lower risk of CHD. This was the first prospective study published to investigate this relationship.

Davidson has conducted multiple randomized, controlled trials for managing anger or depression to examine possible improvements in quality of life, cardiovascular, and cost outcomes. In these studies, patients with depression following acute coronary syndrome (ACS) were found to have significantly decreased symptoms if they were given enhanced treatment (including having their preferred form of treatment) than those given usual care after 6 months.

During the course of her Directorship at CBCH, Davidson has developed team-wide expertise in systematic review methods, and in 2006 she founded the Cochrane Behavioral Medicine Field, an international effort to synthesize and disseminate evidence for behavioral medicine interventions.

Davidson continues to be a prolific researcher and has authored over 250 peer-reviewed articles, numerous editorials and book chapters, served as editor for various handbooks, and served on multiple scientific journal editorial boards. Her recent research includes an N-of-1 study in cancer survivors to identify potential treatments for depression, collaborating with NewYork-Presbyterian Hospital to look at means of increasing patient flow through the emergency department, and acting as the Resource and Coordinating Center for the NIH’s Science of Behavior Change Research Network.

Honors and awards
Davidson has won numerous awards and accolades for research, teaching, and mentoring, including a Distinguished Teaching award from the University of Alabama Arts and Science School, a Distinguished Service Award and a Distinguished Science Award from the Society for Behavioral Medicine, a Career Service Award from the Health Psychology Division of the American Psychological Association, a European Health Psychology Fellow award, and, most recently, the Columbia University Medical Center/Irving Institute Mentor of the Year.

Memberships 
Davidson has served the professional bodies in her field at the highest levels, as President of the Health Psychology Division of the American Psychological Association, and as President of the Academy of Behavioral Medicine Research. She is also a serving member of the United States Preventative Services Task Force and is currently the Chair of the National Heart, Lung and Blood Institute (NHLBI) joint Council-Board of External Experts Strategic Planning Committee.

Selected publications
 Davidson KW, Kronish IM, Shaffer JA. An Innovative or Disconcerting Approach to the Psychosocial Care of Your Patient With a Cardiac Condition: Are You a Lumper or a Splitter? JAMA Intern Med. 2014;174(6):936-937.
 Davidson KW, Peacock J, Kronish IM, Edmondson D. Personalizing behavior change interventions through single-patient (N-of-1) randomized controlled trials. Soc Personal Psychol Compass. 2014;8(8):408-421.
 Davidson KW, Bigger JT, Burg MM, et al. Centralized, Stepped, Patient Preference-Based Treatment for Patients With Post-Acute Coronary Syndrome Depression: CODIACS Vanguard Randomized Controlled Trial. JAMA Intern Med. 2013;173(11):997-1004.
 Davidson KW, Mostofsky E. Anger expression and risk of coronary heart disease: Evidence from the Nova Scotia Health Survey. Am Heart J. 2010;159(2):199-206.
 Davidson KW, Burg MM, Kronish IM, et al. Association of Anhedonia With Recurrent Major Adverse Cardiac Events and Mortality 1 Year After Acute Coronary Syndrome. Arch Gen Psychiatry. 2010;67(5):480-488.
 Davidson KW, Mostofsky E, Whang W. Don’t worry, be happy: Positive affect and reduced 10-year incident coronary heart disease: The Canadian Nova Scotia Health Survey. Eur Heart J. 2010;31(9):1065-1070. 
 Davidson KW, Burg M, Shimbo D. Endothelin-1 release and stimulation of the inflammatory cascade is acute coronary syndrome triggered by watching spectator sports? J Am Coll Cardiol. 2010;55(7):643-644.
 Davidson KW, Rieckmann N, Clemow L, et al. Enhanced Depression Care for Patients With Acute Coronary Syndrome and Persistent Depressive Symptoms: Coronary Psychosocial Evaluation Studies Randomized Controlled Trial. Arch Intern Med. 2010;170(7):600-608.
 Davidson KW, Schwartz JE, Kirkland SA, et al. Relation of inflammation to depression and incident coronary heart disease (from the Canadian Nova Scotia Health Survey [NSHS95] Prospective Population Study). Am J Cardiol. 2009;103(6):755-761.
 Davidson KW, Gidron Y, Mostofsky E, Trudeau KJ. Hospitalization cost offset of a hostility intervention for coronary heart disease patients. J Consult Clin Psychol. 2007;75(4):657-662.

References

External links 
 Center for Behavioral Cardiovascular Health
 Science of Behavior Change Research Network
 NIH Common Fund- Science of Behavior Change Overview
 Science of Behavior Change Wikipedia Page

Academic staff of the Dalhousie University
University of Alabama faculty
Icahn School of Medicine at Mount Sinai faculty